Big Stone City School District #25-1 is a school district headquartered in Big Stone City, South Dakota.

 Christopher Folk is the CEO/Business Manager of the district.

References

External links
 Big Stone City School District 25-1
School districts in South Dakota
Grant County, South Dakota